Ruše is a small town in northeastern Slovenia. It is the seat of the Municipality of Ruše and lies on the right bank of the Drava River west of Maribor. The area is part of the traditional region of Styria. It is now included in the Drava Statistical Region.

Name
Ruše was mentioned in written sources in 1091 as Rovste (and as Roiste in 1184 and Råst in 1372, among other names). The name developed from the plural demonym *Rovьščane, derived from *rovъ 'ditch, trench', thus referring to people living near such a feature.

Church
The parish church in the settlement is dedicated to the Holy Name of Mary and belongs to the Roman Catholic Archdiocese of Maribor. It was first mentioned in written documents dating to 1387, but was destroyed in an Ottoman raid in 1532. It was rebuilt soon after and then extended in the 17th century. The church was damaged by fire in 1779.

References

External links

 Ruše on Geopedia
 Ruše municipal site

Populated places in the Municipality of Ruše
Cities and towns in Styria (Slovenia)